Monica Barnes (12 February 1936 – 2 May 2018)  was an Irish Fine Gael politician who served as a Teachta Dála (TD) for the Dún Laoghaire constituency from 1982 to 1992 and 1997 to 2002. She was a Senator for the Labour Panel from February 1982 to November 1982 and a Member of the Council of State from 1991 to 1995. She was a feminist and women's right activist who co-founded the Council for the Status of Women (now the National Women's Council).

Early life 
Barnes was born Monica MacDermott on 12 February 1936 in Carrickmacross, Co. Monaghan. Her father was a trade unionist who worked at the Gypsum Industries Factory in Kingscourt, Co. Cavan. She was educated at the Louis Convent, Carrickmacross, County Monaghan, a boarding school to which she won a county council scholarship. She failed the Leaving Certificate Maths exam, which meant she could not progress to university. She worked in London as a clerk in the London Stock Exchange. After returning to Ireland, she mer and married Bob Barnes and the couple moved to Rathnines, Dublin.

Barnes had two daughters and a son. After the birth of her first child, she later said she suffered from post-natal depression, a condition largely unrecognised in Ireland at the time. She was told by her doctor to "pull yourself together". Subsequently she set up a support group for women with the condition and began to take an interest in equality and women's rights.

Political career 
In 1973, the Report of the Commission on the Status of Women was published, identifying 49 discriminations to be removed and 19 suggestions as to how the status of women in Ireland could be improved. Also in 1973, the Irish government requested permission from the European Economic Community (EEC) to delay implementation of the Equal Pay directive when the country joined. In response, Barnes co-founded the Council for the Status of Women (now the National Women's Council) in 1973, a move which prompted her to fully commit herself to politics. The then Minister for Labour, Michael O'Leary, appointed Barnes as a member of the Employment Equality Agency which was set up by the Employment Equality Act (1977).

In 1975, Barnes founded and was chairwoman of Woman Elect, an organisation to encourage and support women to stand for election. Barnes unsuccessfully contested the 1981 general election in the Dún Laoghaire constituency, and after a further defeat at the February 1982 general election she was elected to the 16th Seanad as a Senator for the Labour Panel. Barnes also unsuccessfully contested the European Parliament election for the Leinster constituency in 1979 and 1994.

She was first elected to Dáil Éireann at the November 1982 general election. In the second election of 1982, she topped the poll for Fine Gael. In 1983, she opposed the wording of the Eighth Amendment to the Constitution, which gave equal right to life of the unborn and pregnant women. She was subjected to a hate campaign and received death threats during this time. "I had to stand up for women, and for the health and future of women". She retained her seat until the 1992 general election and was re-elected at the 1997 general election. She retired at the 2002 general election.

Barnes was credited as a feminist and an advocate of women's rights. She was seen as having made a critical intervention that led to the passing of the Health (Family Planning) (Amendment) Bill 1985, which gave Irish adults the right to purchase non-medical contraceptives without having to get a doctor's prescription, which passed the Dáil by a narrow margin.

Death 
Barnes died on 2 May 2018 at her home in Glenageary, County Dublin aged 82.

References

1936 births
2018 deaths
Fine Gael TDs
Fine Gael senators
Irish feminists
Irish women's rights activists
Members of the 16th Seanad
20th-century women members of Seanad Éireann
Members of the 24th Dáil
Members of the 25th Dáil
Members of the 26th Dáil
Members of the 28th Dáil
20th-century women Teachtaí Dála
21st-century women Teachtaí Dála
People from Dún Laoghaire
Presidential appointees to the Council of State (Ireland)